Eugene van Maldeghem, also known as Romaan Eugeen Van Maldeghem, (24 April 1813, Dentergem – 1867, Elsene) was a Flemish painter of history, landscape, and portraits. He was a pupil of G. Wappers. The Museum of Fine Arts, Ghent contains his 'Charles V. at the Hospital of St. Just', and the Brussels Museum contains his 'The Bishop St. Alphonse'.

References

Source

1813 births
1867 deaths
19th-century Flemish painters
People from Dentergem